Duchamp is a British men's luxury clothing and accessories company founded in 1989.

History
The company was founded in 1989 by Mitchell Jacobs, a former buyer at Browns. The company was named after the French artist Marcel Duchamp with the following claim by Jacobs : "Duchamp turned everyday objects into art and I turned everyday icons of men's fashion into wearable art". Duchamp initially specialised in cufflinks and branched in 1992 into ties, with characteristic bold colours and "futuristic" designs. Jacobs established a wholesale trade and opened in 1998 a small boutique in Notting Hill In 2006, when the founder sold the company to its management and the private-equity fund Kcaj LLP, Marc Psarolis became part-owner and chief executive. The same year, the company opened a 750-square-foot store on Regent Street and introduced a line of shirts. In 2011, the company claimed to sell "more than 60,000 ties a year [...] as well as cufflinks, suits, jackets, socks and shirts".

Stores

United Kingdom
Jermyn Street, London

References

Further reading

External links

London – Avalon Travel
London e>>guide : in style, in the know, online – DK Publishing

Clothing brands
British brands
Clothing brands of the United Kingdom
Clothing retailers of England
Clothing companies of England